Reynès is a commune in the Pyrénées-Orientales department in southern France.

Geography 
Reynès is in the canton of Le Canigou and in the arrondissement of Céret.

Population

Talc 
Reynès was home to a very productive talc mine which operated from 1876 to 1987. The extracted talc was used in various industries: soap making in Marseilles, porcelain making in Limoges and leather curing. In 1929 the mine installed an aerial wire system to facilitate the transportation of wagons down into the deep valley. In 1930, 440 tons of talc were extracted from the mine.

See also
Communes of the Pyrénées-Orientales department

References

External links
https://anglophone-direct.com/walk-the-region-reynes/

Communes of Pyrénées-Orientales